The 2001 Estonian Figure Skating Championships were held in Tallinn from December 9 to 10, 2000. Skaters competed in the disciplines of men's singles, ladies' singles, pair skating, and ice dancing on the senior and junior levels.

Senior results

Men
4 participants

Ladies

Pairs

Ice dancing

Junior results
The 2001 Estonian Junior Figure Skating Championships took place in Tallinn from January 13 through 14, 2001.

Men

Ladies
11 participants

Ice dancing

References

Figure Skating Championships
2000 in figure skating
Estonian Figure Skating Championships, 2001
Estonian Figure Skating Championships